Oran Egypt Jackson (born 16 October 1998) is an English semi-professional footballer who plays as a defender.

Club career

Milton Keynes Dons
Jackson joined Milton Keynes Dons' academy at a young age, progressing through various age groups and into the club's development squad. On 7 May 2016, Jackson made his debut for the first team, featuring as a substitute in the 88th minute in a 1–2 home defeat to Nottingham Forest. On 26 July 2016, following an impressive spell in pre-season, Jackson signed professional terms with the club signing a one-year deal with an option of a further 12 months.

On 17 February 2017, Jackson joined National League South side Hemel Hempstead Town on a youth loan deal until the end of the 2016–17 season, eventually making 4 appearances for the club. On 14 June 2017, Jackson's contract was extended until summer 2018 and later again until the summer of 2019. However, following limited first team opportunities, Jackson was one of ten players released by the club at the end of the 2018–19 season.

ÍBV
On 18 July 2019, Jackson signed for Icelandic Úrvalsdeild club ÍBV.

St Ives Town
Jackson signed for Southern League Premier Central side St Ives Town in 6 September 2020.

Career statistics

References

External links

Living people
1998 births
People from Milton Keynes
English footballers
Association football defenders
Milton Keynes Dons F.C. players
Hemel Hempstead Town F.C. players
Brackley Town F.C. players
Billericay Town F.C. players
St Ives Town F.C. players
English Football League players
English expatriate footballers
Expatriate footballers in Iceland
English expatriate sportspeople in Iceland
Footballers from Buckinghamshire